Daviesia flava is a species of flowering plant in the family Fabaceae and is endemic to Queensland. It is a glabrous shrub with linear or narrowly egg-shaped phyllodes, and uniformly yellow flowers.

Description

Taxonomy and naming
Daviesia flava was first formally described in 1977 by Leslie Pedley in the journal Austrobaileya from specimens collected near the Kuranda-Mareeba road in 1962. The specific epithet (flava) means "yellow".

Distribution and habitat
This species of pea grows in open forest and woodland on hillside and rocky slopes between Laura and Townsville in far north Queensland.

Conservation status
Daviesia flava is listed as of "least concern" under the Queensland Government Nature Conservation Act 1992.

References

flava
Flora of Queensland
Plants described in 1977